The Elm City baseball club, or New Haven Elm Citys in modern nomenclature, were a professional baseball team based in New Haven, Connecticut ("The Elm City"). The Elm Citys played 47 games during their existence, and had a win–loss record of 7–40. They played their home games at the Howard Avenue Grounds. It is considered a major league team by those who count the National Association of Professional Base Ball Players as a major league.

See also
1875 New Haven Elm Citys season

External links
Major League Baseball in Gilded Age Connecticut: The Rise and Fall of the Middletown, New Haven and Hartford Clubs (complete history of New Haven Elm City Club)

References

Defunct National Association baseball teams
Elm Citys
Professional baseball teams in Connecticut
Baseball teams in the New York metropolitan area
1875 establishments in Connecticut
1875 disestablishments in Connecticut
Baseball teams established in 1875
Sports clubs disestablished in 1875
Defunct baseball teams in Connecticut
Baseball teams disestablished in 1875